Honolulu County (officially known as the City and County of Honolulu, formerly Oahu County) is a consolidated city-county in the U.S. state of Hawaii. The city-county includes both the city of Honolulu (the state's capital and largest city) and the rest of the island of Oʻahu, as well as several minor outlying islands, including all of the Northwestern Hawaiian Islands (islands beyond Niihau) except Midway Atoll.

The consolidated city-county was established in the city charter adopted in 1907 and accepted by the Legislature of the Territory of Hawaii. As a municipal corporation and jurisdiction it manages aspects of government traditionally exercised by both municipalities and counties in the rest of the United States.

As of the 2020 United States Census, the population was 1,016,508. Because of Hawaii's municipal structure, the United States Census Bureau divides Honolulu County into several census-designated places for statistical purposes.

The mayor of Honolulu County is Rick Blangiardi. The county motto is "Haaheo No O Honolulu (Honolulu Pride)". About 70% of the state's population lives in Honolulu County. Only Nevada has a higher percentage of its population living in its most populous county. 43.0% of residents identify as Asian or Asian American, the highest of any U.S. county.

Geography
However, the majority of this area is the Pacific Ocean that surrounds the islands.

Adjacent counties
 Maui County - southeast
 Kauai County - northwest of population center

National protected areas
 James Campbell National Wildlife Refuge
 Oʻahu Forest National Wildlife Refuge
 Papahānaumokuākea Marine National Monument
 Pearl Harbor National Wildlife Refuge
 USS Arizona Memorial

Government

Local government
Originally governed by a Board of Supervisors, the Honolulu County is administered under a mayor-council system of governance overseeing all municipal services: civil defense, emergency medical, fire, parks and recreation, police, sanitation, streets, and water, among others. For 2013, the county has an annual operating budget of US$2.16 billion.

The government of Honolulu County is simplified and streamlined and coalesces at three major divisions of municipal power.
The mayor of Honolulu is the principal executor of administrative authority.  The mayor is elected on a non-partisan basis to a four-year term.
The Honolulu City Council is the unicameral legislative body. Its elected members are responsible for drafting and passing laws, as well as proposing budgets for various departments. Unlike other cities in the United States, the council is absolutely independent of the mayor, who does not make any appearances during any of the council sessions. The nine council members each represent one of nine districts, and are elected on a non-partisan basis to staggered four-year terms.
The Prosecuting Attorney of Honolulu is independently elected of the other two major divisions of municipal power, and is charged with prosecuting criminal offenses committed within the county.  The office is not charged with providing legal counsel to the mayor or City Council; that duty is a responsibility of the Department of Corporation Counsel, under mayoral jurisdiction. The prosecuting attorney is elected on a non-partisan basis to a four-year term.

The Honolulu County is divided into 36 neighborhood boards. The office of neighborhood board member is an advisory position for public policy and civil investment. Members are elected to two-year terms.

County districts

Honolulu County has nine districts, each of which elects a member of the city-county council. The boundaries of each district are revised every ten years in conjunction with the U.S. Census.

 District I: Ewa, Ewa Beach, Honouliuli, West Loch, Kapolei, Makakilo, Kalaeloa, Honokai Hale and Nanakai Gardens, Ko Olina, Nānākuli, Waianae, Mākaha, Keaau, Mākua.
 District II: Mililani Mauka, Wahiawā, Whitmore Village, Mokulēia, Waialua, Haleiwa, Waimea, Pūpūkea, Sunset Beach, Kahuku, Lāie, Hauula, Punaluu, Kahana Bay, Kaaawa, Kualoa, Waiāhole, Kahaluu, Āhuimanu, Heeia.
 District III: Waimānalo, Kailua, Kāneohe.
 District IV: Hawaii Kai, Kuliouou, Niu Valley, Āina Haina, Wailupe, Waialae-Iki, Kalani Valley, Kāhala, Wilhelmina Rise, a portion of Kapahulu, a portion of Kaimukī, Diamond Head, Waikīkī, Ala Moana.
 District V: Kapahulu, Kaimukī, Pālolo Valley, St. Louis Heights, Mānoa, Mōiliili, McCully, Kakaako, Ala Moana, Makiki.
 District VI: Makiki, downtown Honolulu, Punchbowl, Liliha, Pauoa Valley, Nuuanu, Ālewa Heights, Papakōlea, Kalihi Valley, Kalihi.
 District VII: Kalihi, Kapālama (aka Pālama), Iwilei, Sand Island, Māpunapuna, Airport, Hickam, Pearl Harbor, Ford Island, Āliamanu, Salt Lake, Foster Village, Aloha Stadium, Hālawa Valley Estates.
 District VIII: Fort Shafter, Moanalua, Hālawa, Aiea, Pearl City, Seaview, Crestview.
 District IX: Waikele, Waipahu, Village Park, Kunia, Mililani, Waipio Gentry.

Civic center
The civic center is coextensive with what is known as the Capitol District in downtown Honolulu. The official seat of governance for the Honolulu County is located within the district at Honolulu Hale, established in the 1920s as a city hall structure and houses the chambers of the mayor of Honolulu and the Honolulu City Council. In the 1960s and 1970s, Mayor Frank Fasi developed the modern civic center as it is known today. He took controversial and aggressive measures to reclaim property, demolish massive concrete structures in the area, construct underground parking facilities and open a green campus above ground with manicured lawns and specially commissioned sculpted artwork. He also oversaw the construction of new government buildings, to house the departments that fell within mayoral jurisdiction. The most prominent of those new buildings were the Honolulu Municipal Building and Hale Makai, the headquarters of the Honolulu Police Department. Civic centers were also constructed off the Capitol District campus, including the Kapiolani Bandstand, Neal S. Blaisdell Center, and the Waikīkī Shell.

Municipal services
The Honolulu County collects various forms of taxes, including a property tax. Revenue from those taxes is used to provide several services for the residents.

Services include:
Honolulu Board of Water Supply
Honolulu Fire Department
Honolulu Emergency Medical Services
TheBus
Honolulu Police Department
The Liquor Commission regulates intoxicating liquors.

State representation

The Hawaii Department of Public Safety operates three prisons, including the Halawa Correctional Facility, the Waiawa Correctional Facility, and the Women's Community Correctional Center, on the island of Oʻahu in the City and County of Honolulu. In addition the Oʻahu Community Correctional Center, the jail on Oʻahu, is in the county.

Federal representation
The United States Postal Service operates post offices in Honolulu County. The main one is located by the Honolulu International Airport at 3600 Aolele Street. Federal Detention Center, Honolulu, operated by the Federal Bureau of Prisons, is in the CDP. The Federal Bureau of Investigation (FBI) Honolulu field office is in Kapolei. The Kunia Regional SIGINT Operations Center of the National Security Agency (NSA) and the Wheeler Army Airfield are in Honolulu County.

Honolulu County, like the rest of Hawaii, is a Democratic stronghold. Although, it tends to be the most Republican-leaning county in the state.

Demographics

As of the census of 2010, there were 953,207 people, 311,047 households, and 217,842 families residing in Honolulu County. The racial makeup of the county was 43.9% Asian, 20.8% white, 9.5% Pacific Islander, 2.0% black or African American, 0.3% Native American, 1.1% from other races, and 22.3% from two or more races. Hispanic or Latino of any race were 9.1% of the population. The largest ancestry groups were:

15.7% Japanese
14.9% Filipino
5.9% German
5.4% Chinese
5.0% Native Hawaiian
4.4% Irish
3.8% English
3.1% Portuguese
2.9% Puerto Rican
2.3% Korean
2.3% Mexican
1.8% Samoan
1.8% Italian
1.8% Spanish
1.4% French

In the census of 2000, there were 286,450 households, out of which 31.8% had children under the age of 18 living with them, 54.5% were married couples living together, 12.3% had a female householder with no husband present, and 28.2% were non-families. 21.6% of all households were made up of individuals, and 7.0% had someone living alone who was 65 years of age or older. The average household size was 2.95 and the average family size was 3.46.

In the county, the population was spread out, with 23.80% under the age of 18, 10.1% from 18 to 24, 30.6% from 25 to 44, 22.0% from 45 to 64, and 13.4% who were 65 years of age or older. The median age was 36 years. For every 100 females, there were 101.1 males. For every 100 females age 18 and over, there were 99.7 males.

Metropolitan Statistical Area
The United States Office of Management and Budget has designated Honolulu County as the Urban Honolulu, HI Metropolitan Statistical Area.  The United States Census Bureau ranked the Urban Honolulu, HI Metropolitan Statistical Area as the 54th most populous metropolitan statistical area and the 61st most populous primary statistical area of the United States as of July 1, 2012.

Economy

Hawaiian Airlines, Island Air, and Aloha Air Cargo are headquartered in the CDP. Prior to its dissolution, Aloha Airlines was headquartered in the CDP. Other major companies headquartered in Honolulu CDP include First Hawaiian Bank, Bank of Hawaii, and the Hawaiian Electric Company (HECO).

Diplomatic missions
Several countries have diplomatic facilities in Honolulu County. The Consulate-General of Japan in Honolulu is located at 1742 Nuuanu Avenue. The Consulate-General of South Korea in Honolulu is located at 2756 Pali Highway. The Consulate-General of the Philippines in Honolulu is located at 2433 Pali Highway. The Consulate-General of the Federated States of Micronesia in Honolulu is located in Suite 908 at 3049 Ualena Street. The Consulate-General of Australia in Honolulu is located in the penthouse of 1000 Bishop Street. The Consulate-General of the Marshall Islands is located in Suite 301 at 1888 Lusitana Street. The Consulate of the Republic of Kiribati is located at 95 Nakolo Place, Room 265.

Transportation

Air
Located on the western end of the Honolulu census-designated place, Honolulu International Airport (HNL) is the principal aviation gateway to the state of Hawaii.  Numerous airlines fly Pacific-wide to and from Honolulu International Airport.  Locally based Hawaiian Airlines also operates flights to destinations within the islands of Hawaii and to major destinations across the Pacific.

Major highways

Public transportation

Bus
Established by former Mayor Frank F. Fasi, Honolulu's public transit system has been twice honored by the American Public Transportation Association bestowing the title of "America's Best Transit System" for 1994–1995 and 2000–2001. Oʻahu Transit Services' "TheBus" operates 107 routes with a fleet of 525 buses.

In 2004, construction had started on a bus rapid transit (BRT) system using dedicated rights-of-way for buses. The system, proposed by then Mayor Jeremy Harris, was expected to link the Iwilei neighborhood with Waikiki.  However, former Mayor Mufi Hannemann largely dismantled the BRT system and deployed its buses along other express bus routes. 

Most buses in TheBus roster were manufactured by Gillig Corporation of Hayward, California, with the exception of articulated buses made by New Flyer, the latter also providing standard buses, likewise from Nova Bus.

Rail

Currently, there is no urban rail transit system in Honolulu, although electric street railways were used during the early days of Honolulu's history. The last major attempt was called the Honolulu Area Rail Rapid Transit project, popularly known as HART. Proposed in 1968 by Mayor Neal S. Blaisdell and supported by his successor, Frank Fasi, HART was originally envisioned as a  line from Pearl City to Hawaii Kai.  By 1980, however, the project's length was cut to an  segment between the University of Hawaiʻi at Mānoa and Honolulu International Airport.

In the wake of proposed budget cuts by President Ronald Reagan, including the elimination of all funding for transit projects by 1985, newly elected Mayor Eileen Anderson cancelled the project in 1981 and returned grants and funding to their sources, arguing the project would break her vow of fiscal responsibility.

Several attempts had been made since Anderson's cancellation of HART to construct a fixed rail mass transit system.  All attempts stalled in Honolulu City Council hearings until in 2004, the city, county and state approved development of an action plan for a system to be built in several phases. The initial line proposed linking Kapolei in West Oʻahu to the University of Hawaiʻi at Mānoa.  However, on December 22, 2006, the city council approved a fixed-guideway system meant to accommodate either rail or buses, running from Kapolei in West Oʻahu to Ala Moana, with spurs into Waikiki and Manoa.

On November 4, 2008, 50.6% (156,151) of Honolulu County voted to approve a new $4.5 billion rail project that would connect West Oʻahu with downtown, Waikiki and University of Hawaiʻi. The rail project is currently projected to cost $5.27B.

After early delays and postponed dates from not receiving a final approval from then-Governor Linda Lingle to issues involving burial sites, a ground-breaking ceremony to signal the beginning of construction was held on February 22, 2011. Despite the go-ahead, there were still other legal hurdles as the argument over burial sites continued to be a major issue that lead to court order in 2012 to have construction temporary halted. The project itself was once again a political issue in the 2012 mayoral race with former governor Ben Cayetano entering the race in the hopes of killing the project altogether, while then-mayor Carlisle and his predecessor Caldwell both wanted the project to continue. This would result in Carlisle coming in third in the August 2012 primary and leading to a run-off between Cayetano and Caldwell in the November 2012 general election, with Caldwell defeating Cayetano with the support of groups and the public who wanted the rail project to continue. In December 2012, a court order allowed the rail project to resume in all but the one of the two phases so more burial sites could be uncovered.

Education

Colleges and universities
Colleges and universities in Honolulu County include The University of Hawaiʻi System, consisting of University of Hawaiʻi at Mānoa, Honolulu Community College and Kapiolani Community College in the Honolulu CDP, Leeward Community College in Pearl City, University of Hawaiʻi – West Oʻahu in Kapolei, and Windward Community College in Kaneohe. University of Hawaiʻi at Mānoa houses the main offices of the University of Hawaiʻi System. New Hope Christian College The private institutions serving the county include Chaminade University, Hawaii Pacific University, and Remington College (Honolulu Campus) in the Honolulu CDP and Brigham Young University–Hawaii in Laie CDP.

Primary and secondary schools
Hawaii Department of Education operates public schools in Honolulu County.

Public libraries
Hawaii State Public Library System operates public libraries. The Hawaii State Library in the Honolulu CDP serves as the main library of the system, while the Library for the Blind and Physically Handicapped, also in the CDP, serves disabled and blind people. In addition the system operates 22 branch libraries throughout the county.

Arts and culture

Performing arts
Established in 1900, the Honolulu Symphony is the oldest US symphony orchestra west of the Rocky Mountains. Other classical music ensembles include the Hawaii Opera Theatre. Honolulu is also a center for Hawaiian music. The main music venues include the Neal Blaisdell Center Concert Hall, the Waikiki Shell, and the Hawaii Theatre.

Honolulu also includes several venues for live theater, including the Diamond Head Theatre.

Visual arts
There are various institutions supported by the state and private entities for the advancement of the visual arts.  The Honolulu Museum of Art is endowed with the largest collection of Asian and Western art in Hawaii.  It also has the largest collection of Islamic art, housed at the Shangri La estate. Since the merger of the Honolulu Academy of Arts and The Contemporary Museum, Honolulu (now called the Honolulu Museum of Art Spalding House) in 2011, the museum is also the only contemporary art museum in the state. The contemporary collections are housed at main campus (Spalding House) in Makiki and a multi-level gallery in downtown Honolulu at the First Hawaiian Center. The museum hosts a film and video program dedicated to arthouse and world cinema in the museum's Doris Duke Theatre, named for the academy's historic patroness Doris Duke.

The Hawaii State Art Museum is also located in downtown Honolulu at No. 1 Capitol District Building and boasts a collection of art pieces created by local artists as well as traditional Hawaiian art.  The museum is administered by the Hawaii State Foundation on Culture and the Arts.

Natural museums
Recognized internationally as the premier cultural institution of Hawaii, the Bishop Museum is the largest of Honolulu's museums. It is endowed with the state's largest collection of natural history specimens and the world's largest collection of Hawaiiana and Pacific culture artifacts. The Honolulu Zoo is the main zoological institution in Hawaii while the Waikiki Aquarium is a working marine biology laboratory.  The Waikiki Aquarium is partnered with the University of Hawaiʻi and other universities worldwide.  Established for appreciation and botany, Honolulu is home to several gardens: Foster Botanical Garden, Liliuokalani Botanical Garden, Walker Estate, among others.

Sports

Currently, Honolulu has no professional sports teams. Honolulu's Aloha Stadium was a long time host of the NFL's annual Pro Bowl from 1980 to 2016. The NCAA's Hawaii Bowl is played at Aloha Stadium annually. Games are hosted at Les Murakami and Hans L'Orange Park.  Fans of spectator sports in Honolulu generally support the football, volleyball, basketball, and baseball programs of the University of Hawaiʻi at Mānoa. High school sporting events, especially football, are especially popular. Venues for spectator sports in Honolulu include:
Aloha Stadium (American football and soccer)
Les Murakami Stadium at the University of Hawaiʻi at Mānoa (baseball)
Stan Sheriff Center at the University of Hawaiʻi at Mānoa (basketball and volleyball)
Neal Blaisdell Center Arena (basketball)

Honolulu's mild climate lends itself to year-round fitness activities as well. In 2004, Men's Fitness magazine named Honolulu the fittest city in the nation. Honolulu is home to three large road races:
The Great Aloha Run is held annually on Presidents' Day.
The Honolulu Marathon, held annually on the second Sunday in December, draws more than 20,000 participants each year, about half to two thirds of them from Japan.
The Honolulu Triathlon is an Olympic distance triathlon event governed by USA Triathlon. Held annually in May since 2004, there is an absence of a sprint course.

Media

Honolulu County is home to numerous forms media including newspapers, magazines, radio and television.

Communities

Census-designated places

Āhuimanu
Aiea
East Honolulu
East Kapolei
Ewa Beach
Ewa Gentry
Ewa Villages
Hālawa
Haleiwa
Hauula
Helemano
Heeia
Hickam Housing
Honolulu
Iroquois Point
Kaaawa
Kahaluu
Kahuku
Kailua
Kalaeloa
Kāneohe
Kaneohe Base (Marine Corps Base Hawaii)
Kapolei
Kawela Bay
Ko Olina
Lāie
Māili
Mākaha
Mākaha Valley
Makakilo
Maunawili
Mililani Mauka
Mililani Town
Mokulēia
Nānākuli
Ocean Pointe
Pearl City
Punaluu
Pūpūkea
Royal Kunia (formerly Village Park)
Schofield Barracks
Wahiawā
Waiāhole
Waialua
Waianae
Waikāne
Waikele
Waimalu
Waimānalo
Waimānalo Beach
Waipahu
Waipio
Waipio Acres
West Loch Estate
Wheeler Army Airfield
Whitmore Village

Other places
Āina Haina
Hawaii Kai
Pauoa

Sister cities

See also

Patsy T. Mink Central Oʻahu Regional Park
National Register of Historic Places listings in Oʻahu

References

External links

 
1907 establishments in Hawaii
Consolidated city-counties
Hawaii counties
Metropolitan areas of Hawaii
Populated places established in 1907